| tries = {{#expr: 
 +  7 +  6 +  8 +  2 +  7 +  4 + 19
 +  4 + 12 +  6 +  7 +  7 +  6 +  9
 + 15 +  4 +  9 +  6 +  4 +  9 +  2 + 18
 +  4 + 10 +  9 +  2
 +  3
}}
| top point scorer = 
| top try scorer = 
| venue = Kassam Stadium, Oxford
| attendance2 = 2,823
| champions =  Auch
| count = 1
| runner-up =   Worcester Warriors
| website = https://web.archive.org/web/20080506141030/http://www.ercrugby.com/eng/
| previous year = 2003–04
| previous tournament = 2003–04 European Shield
| next year = 
| next tournament =
}}
The 2004–05 European Shield (known as the Parker Pen Shield for sponsorship reasons) was the 3rd, and final, season of the European Shield, Europe's third-tier club rugby union competition below the Heineken Cup and European Challenge Cup. A total of 15 teams participated, representing six countries.

This competition was intended to be contested between 12 first round losers from the 2004–05 European Challenge Cup plus 4 other Clubs entering directly into the 1st Round.  The structure of the competition was a purely knockout format; teams played each other on a home and away basis, with the aggregate points winner proceeding to the next round. The final was a single leg.

The competition began on 4 December 2004 and culminated in the final at Kassam Stadium in Oxford on 21 May 2005. Auch secured a victory over Worcester Warriors in the final and picked up their first piece of European Club silverware.

After this season, the European Challenge Cup reverted to its previous "pool and knockout" format and the European Shield was discontinued.

Teams
This competition was intended to be contested between 12 first round losers from the 2004–05 European Challenge Cup, plus 4 other Clubs that joined directly at the 1st Round of the Shield.  AA Coimbra subsequently declined to play in the competition.

Matches

Round 1

1st Leg

2nd Leg

Aggregate Results

Quarter-finals

1st Leg

2nd Leg

Aggregate Results

Semifinals
All kick off times are local.

1st Leg

2nd Leg

Aggregate Results

Final

See also
2004-05 Heineken Cup
2004-05 European Challenge Cup
European Shield

External links
 BBC European Challenge Cup & Shield 2004/5 results summary

References

European
2004–05
2004–05 European Challenge Cup
2004–05 in European rugby union
2004–05 in English rugby union
2004–05 in French rugby union
2004–05 in Italian rugby union
2004–05 in Spanish rugby union
2004–05 in Romanian rugby union
rugby union
rugby union